Se-bin is a Korean unisex given name. Its meaning depends on the hanja used to write each syllable of the name. There are 15 hanja with the reading "se" and 25 hanja with the reading "bin" on the South Korean government's official list of hanja which may be used in given names.
 
People with this name include:
Myung Se-bin (born 1976), South Korean actress
Ha Sebin (born 1983), South Korean male guitarist
Park Se-bin (born 2000), South Korean female figure skater

Fictional characters with this name include:
Jo Se-bin, in 2011 South Korean romance film Hindsight

See also
List of Korean given names

References

Korean unisex given names